Operation Chromite is a 2016 South Korean war drama film directed by John H. Lee and based on the real-life events of the Battle of Inchon, although it presents a fictionalized version of the historical CIA/US military intelligence operation "Trudy Jackson", conducted before the actual landing operation. It was released on 27 July 2016 in South Korea.

Plot 
In 1950, just a few months after North Korean forces have overrun most of South Korea, an American-led UN coalition is deployed to Korea to aid the struggling South Koreans. General Douglas MacArthur devises a secret plan to attack behind enemy lines at the port city of Incheon. The risky strategy is opposed by leaders of the other military branches, forcing MacArthur to devise a clandestine operation to gather essential information from within occupied Incheon by coordinating a weeklong South Korean intelligence operation known as "X-Ray".

The linchpin of this top-secret incursion, Captain Jang Hak-Soo of the South Korean Navy Intelligence Unit (a former North Korean army officer who defected to South Korea after seeing his father executed in front of him by his fellow communist officers), and seven members of the X-Ray unit disguise themselves as a Korean People's Army inspection unit and infiltrate the North Korean command center in Incheon, coordinated by the Soviet-trained commander Lim Gye-Jin, a protégé of Kim Il-Sung. Their prime objective is to determine the placement of North Korean defenses (such as mines and artillery) and the tactical characteristics of the Incheon harbor (notorious for swift currents and major tidal surges), and secure a lighthouse crucial to the landing's success.

Immediately suspicious of Jang's "inspection mission", Lim attempts to impede his comrade's investigation and orders his staff to monitor the new arrivals closely. The U.S. command relays MacArthur's orders to obtain navigation charts showing naval mine placements in the harbor and prepare a strategy to assist the coalition forces with landing an amphibious assault in a narrow two-hour window between tides. When contacts within the South Korean military intelligence unit known as KLO (Korean Liaison Office, predecessor to present-day South Korean Headquarters of Intelligence Detachment, or HID) warn Jang that time is running out to successfully complete the mission, he pushes his group to extremes. Meanwhile, in Tokyo, MacArthur prepares Operation Chromite, an invasion force of 75,000 UN troops and over 200 warships, to imminently depart for the Korean Peninsula.

Cast 

 Lee Jung-jae as Jang Hak-soo
 Lee Beom-soo as Lim Gye-jin
 Liam Neeson as General Douglas MacArthur 
 Jin Se-yeon as Han Chae-seon
 Jung Joon-ho as Seo Jin-chul
 Kim Byeong-ok as Choi Suk-joong
 Park Chul-min as Nam Ki-sung
 Jon Gries as Hoyt Vandenberg
 Gil Geum-sung as Chun Dal-joong
 Shin Soo-hang as Kang Bong-po
 Kim Hee-jin as Ryu Jang-choon
 Jung Min-ji as Ok Gil-ryun
 Naya as Yeo Ga-soo
 Lee Choong-goo as Hwa-gyoon
 Sung Hyuk as Song Sang-deuk
 Go Yoon as commando
 Jang Joon-hak as Yang Pan-dong
 Sean Richard Dulake as Lt. Col. Edward L. Rowny
 Justin Rupple as Alexander Haig
 Jin Yong-ok as Jo In-gook
 Park Jung-won as Ri Kyung-shik
 Yang Bum as Ham Kwang-suk
 Lee Hae-joon as Ji Jin-pyo
 Josie Bissett as Jean MacArthur
 Yoon Suk-jin as Do Hong-gyoo
 Kim Joong-hee as Joo Hyun-pil
 Yun Da-yeong as Gye Eun-sook
 Kim Se-jung as Uhm Gi-soon
 Park Sung-woong as Park Nam-chul (cameo)
 Kim Sun-a as Kim Hwa-young (cameo)
 Kim Young-ae as Na Jung-nim (cameo)
 Choo Sung-hoon as Baek San (cameo)
 Lee Won-jong as Kim Il-sung (cameo)
 Jung Kyung-soon as Jung Sun-sil (cameo)

English dubbing 

 Song Sang-deuk - Sean Chiplock
 Darrel Delfin

Reception
The film was number-one on its opening at the South Korean box office, grossing . with around seven million tickets sold . It grossed  worldwide.

In the United Kingdom, it was 2017's best-selling foreign language film on home video, above Your Name in second place.

On review aggregation website Rotten Tomatoes, the film holds an approval rating of 40% based on 20 reviews, with an average rating of 5/10. At Metacritic, the film has a weighted average score of 50 out of 100, based on 8 critics, indicating "mixed or average reviews".

Extended cut
A South Korean release of the Blu-Ray version put the extended cut at 141 minutes.

Sequel

The Battle of Jangsari 9.15, a sequel to the film Chromite, was released in 2019, the second part of a trilogy. The film covers a later small attack at Jangsari, intended to draw North Korean attention from Inchon.

Accolades

References

External links 
 
 

2016 films
2016 war drama films
2016 drama films
CJ Entertainment films
Drama films based on actual events
Films about Douglas MacArthur
Films set in 1950
Films set in North Korea
Films set in Incheon
Films set in Pyongyang
Films set in Tokyo
Films shot in South Korea
Korean War films
South Korean spy films
South Korean war drama films
Spy films based on actual events
War films based on actual events
Films about the Republic of Korea Armed Forces
Films about navies
Cultural depictions of Douglas MacArthur
Films about the Korean People's Army
2010s South Korean films